The 2022 City of Jesolo Trophy was the 13th annual Trofeo di Jesolo gymnastics competition held in Jesolo, Italy. Both senior and junior gymnasts were invited to compete.  The previous two iterations of the competition were canceled due to the global COVID-19 pandemic.

Medalists

Results

Senior

Team

All-Around

Vault

Uneven Bars

Balance Beam

Floor Exercise

Participants
The following federations will be sending teams:
 
 Senior team: Maellyse Brassart, Margaux Dandois, Keziah Langendock, Noemie Louon, Lisa Vaelen, Jutta Verkest
 Junior team: Chloe Baert, Nell Bogaert, Eva Brunysels, Aberdeen O'Driscoll, Erika Pinxten, Axelle Vanden Berghe
  
 Senior team: Ellie Black, Jenna Lalonde, Cassie Lee, Ava Stewart, Rose Woo
 Junior team: Creistella Brunetti-Burns, Victoriane Charron, Tegan Shaver
 
 Senior team: Coline Devillard, Silane Mielle, Morgane Osyssek, Célia Serber, Louane Versaveau
 Junior team: Audrey Cozzi, Ambre Frotté, Ming Gheradi Van Eijken, Léna Khenoun, Lilou Viallat
 
 
 Senior team: Angela Andreoli, Asia D'Amato, Manila Esposito, Martina Maggio, Veronica Mandriota, Giorgia Villa
 Junior team: Giulia Antoniotti, Chiara Barzasi, Arianna Belardelli, Alessia Guicciardi, Juli Marano, Viola Pierazzini
 
 Senior team: Ana Bărbosu, Maria Ceplinschi, Bianca Dorobantu, Andreea Preda, Silviana Sfiringu, Ioana Stănciulescu
 Junior team: Amalia Ghigoarta, Ella Opprea, Amalia Puflea, Teodora Stoian, Crina Tudor, Sabrina Voinea
  
 Senior team: eMjae Frazier, Shilese Jones, Konnor McClain, Zoe Miller, Elle Mueller, Ashlee Sullivan
 Junior team: Madray Johnson, Myli Lew, Zoey Molomo, Ella Murphy, Tiana Sumanasekera, Gabby Van Frayen

References

City of Jesolo Trophy
City of Jesolo Trophy
City of Jesolo Trophy
International gymnastics competitions hosted by Italy
City of Jesolo Trophy